Into the Abyss: How a Deadly Plane Crash Changed the Lives of a Pilot, a Politician, a Criminal and a Cop is a non-fiction book, written by the Canadian writer Carol Shaben, first published in September 2012 by Random House. The book's narrative chronicles the doomed flight of a Piper Navajo commuter plane, and the plight of four survivors as they endured the remote wilderness of northern Alberta where the plane had crashed.

Awards and honours
Into the Abyss received the 2013 "Edna Staebler Award for Creative Non-Fiction".

See also
List of Edna Staebler Award recipients
Larry Shaben
Grant Notley

References

External links
Carol Shaben. Home page. Retrieved March 12, 2013.
CBC article about the crash

Canadian non-fiction books
2012 non-fiction books
Random House books